The 131st Pennsylvania Volunteer Infantry was an infantry regiment that served in the Union Army during the American Civil War.

Service
The 131st Pennsylvania Infantry was organized at Camp Curtin near Harrisburg, Pennsylvania, and mustered in August 1862 for nine month's service under the command of Colonel Peter H. Allabach.

The regiment was attached to 2nd Brigade, 3rd Division, V Corps, Army of the Potomac.

The 131st Pennsylvania Infantry mustered out May 23, 1863.

Detailed service
Moved to Washington, D.C., August 20, and duty there until September 14. Moved to Sharpsburg, Md., and duty there until October 30. Movement to Falmouth, Va., October 30-November 19. Battle of Fredericksburg December 12-15. Burnside's 2nd Campaign, "Mud March," January 20-24, 1863. Duty at Falmouth until April. Chancellorsville Campaign April 27-May 6. Battle of Chancellorsville May 1-5

Casualties
The regiment lost a total of 83 men during service; 2 officers and 36 enlisted men killed or mortally wounded, 1 officer and 44 enlisted men died of disease.

Commanders
 Colonel Peter H. Allabach
 Lieutenant Colonel William B. Shaut - commanded the regiment almost entirely throughout its term of service due to Col. Allabach being promoted to brigade command
 Major Robert W. Patton - commanded at the Battle of Chancellorsville

See also

 List of Pennsylvania Civil War Units
 Pennsylvania in the Civil War

References
 Dyer, Frederick H. A Compendium of the War of the Rebellion (Des Moines, IA: Dyer Pub. Co.), 1908.
 Orwig, Joseph R. History of the 131st Penna. Volunteers, War of 1861-5 (Williamsport, PA: Sun Book and Job Printing House), 1902.
Attribution

External links
 National flag of the 131st Pennsylvania Infantry

Military units and formations established in 1862
Military units and formations disestablished in 1863
Units and formations of the Union Army from Pennsylvania